Saldus is a Latvian town located in Courland and is the main town, and the central location in Saldus Municipality. The name Saldus has been noted in historical sources as far back as the mid-13th century, but the founding year is considered to be 1856, and it gained town rights in 1917.

The city is almost precisely in between Riga and Liepāja (slightly closer to ‘Liepāja’ (100 km), than Riga (119 km). River Ciecere flows through Saldus, and it is a tributary to one of Latvia’s biggest rivers Venta.

The city is often referred to as "the Bowl of Courland". This is because of a famous quote by Māris Čaklais: "A drop of honey in the bowl of Courland". The reasoning behind the quote is the fact that from a high point, the city looks like a crater.

As of January 2019, Saldus is the 17th-largest city in Latvia according to population data. In 2019 the town had a population of 9937.

History

Early history 

According to archeological research, the whole territory that is now Saldus was inhabited by the Baltic tribe Couronians in the 20th century BC. The centre of defence at the time, Saldus Castle, was located by Lake Saldus until the 13th century,

1856 is considered the year Saldus was founded, when the Board of Domens decided to establish a trade center. Although there was an active economy by the end of the 19th century, and Saldus was the cultural center of the region, it was not officially recognized as a town until 1917.

One of the oldest buildings in the town is Saldus St.John's church. Documents from 1461 mention a wooden church. It has been reconstructed several times. The tower, bombed in 1944, was rebuilt in 1981–82.

 the town had a population of 9937.

Demographics 

The population of Saldus has been decreasing since the first recorded census. It declined more rapidly when moving to United Kingdom became a valid choice for the people of Latvia.

Economy 
Saldus has developed itself as an important cultural, educational, business and trade center. There are about 500 approved companies operating in Saldus, with main branches in building construction, wood processing, and food processing.

These days Saldus also boasts a very active cultural life, featuring local musicians, poets, painters, and artists.

Tourism

Hymn 
The official hymn of the city, written by Ēriks Ķiģelis and Māris Čaklais, is ‘’Saldus saule’’ (English: Saldus Sun).

On November 18, 2018, 32 years since its release in 1986, the song was finally publicly acknowledged as the official hymn.

Education 

The city boasts an active cultural and social life. In the center of it has always been Education. Home to schools of the future and the past. All educational institutions are coed.

Since 1946 Saldus has been home to the Saldus School of Music. In 1984 Saldus Art School was founded.

On March 22, 2013 the Saldus Art School moved to the newly built building.

Up until 2016, there were 2 high schools in the city: Saldus Gymnasium (ex 1.st High School) and Saldus Secondary High School. Saldus Gymnasium was terminated and never started the school year in 2016. Saldus Secondary High School was re-named Saldus High School.

Educational institutions 

 6 Pre-school educational institutions
 3 Primary Schools
 Saldus High School
 Vocational High School
 Saldus Art and Music School

Culture and contemporary life

Concerts

Saldus Saule festival 
Yearly Rock festival 'Saldus Saule' makes Saldus a well known city in and around Latvia. The first "Saldus saule" took place in 1987. But the idea and concept were conceived earlier.

October 3, 1985, saw the death of a beloved musician - Ēriks Ķiģelis. The twenty-somethings of that time wanted to keep his memory alive and so the festival was born. Due to the USSR regime, the festival could not be named after Ēriks Ķiģelis.

The first festival was first organized by famous music sociologist Juris Vilcāns and Ēriks Niedra.

Geography 
Saldus is geographically located in the ‘Austrumkursas’ Highlands. It is the biggest city in the Highlands. The city was built on both shores of the river ‘Ciecere’ and on the east side of the city lies ‘Saldus lake’. The city is considered to be one of the greenest cities in Latvia, due to being characterized with parks, squares and bountiful greenery.

There are many tiny rivers, that flowing through Saldus, but only one important one. Interestingly other rivers are also named.

Saldus Lake 
The lake lies north-east of the city, on the edge of the city. The lake’s north-west and south-east shores are incredibly steep. The lake has an estuary – Vēršāda (a tributary from river, and a tributary – Kaļķupīte. The deepest point is 5 m. On the south-west shore there is an artificial beach.

River Ciecere 
River Ciecere is a 51 km long right-bank tributary to river Venta. The river itself has 52 tributaries. It flows out from Lake Ciecere and for 6 km flows through Saldus, creating a very rich green-zone in the city center. The river has 14 crossing bridges. In Saldus there are a few artificial waterfalls. There are nature-walks along the river bank. In the 17th century, the river was navigable by ship and boat.

Notable people
Johann von Besser (1654–1729) – German writer
Jānis Blūms (born 1982) – basketball player
Ursula Donath (born 1931) – German athlete
Janis Rozentāls (1866–1917) – painter
Lea Davidova-Medene (1921–1986) – sculptor
Māris Čaklais (1940–2003) – poet
Ēriks Ķiģelis (1955–1985) – musician
Dons (born 1984) – singer
Ieva Laguna (born 1990) – top model
Uģis Žaļims (born 1986) – bobsledder
Oskars Kalpaks (6 January 1882 – 6 March 1919) - Battalion Commander

International relations

Twin towns – Sister cities
Saldus is twinned with:

 Paide, Estonia
 Mažeikiai, Lithuania
 Šilutė, Lithuania
 Liederbach am Taunus, Germany
 Lidingö, Sweden
 Stargard, Poland
 Sergiyev Posad, Russia
 Villebon-sur-Yvette, France
 Sankt Andrä, Austria
 Las Rozas Del Madrid, Spain
 Volda, Norway
 Tsqaltubo, Georgia
 Florești, Moldova
Source

See also

List of cities in Latvia
Janis Rozentāls

Gallery

References

 
Towns in Latvia
1917 establishments in Latvia
Populated places established in 1917
Saldus Municipality
Courland